Aubrie Lee Sellers (born February 12, 1991) is an American country music singer, songwriter, and musician. She is the daughter of singer/songwriters Jason Sellers and Lee Ann Womack; and the stepdaughter of music producer Frank Liddell. Sellers's debut album, New City Blues, was released on January 29, 2016, through Carnival Music. Many of the songs on New City Blues were co-written with Adam Wright.

She was featured on Dr. Ralph's 2015 album, Ralph Stanley and Friends: A Man of Constant Sorrow, where she sang “White Dove” with her mother, Lee Ann Womack.

Influences
Sellers has cited numerous musical influences that reach across genres: The Kinks, Screamin' Jay Hawkins, Buddy and Julie Miller, Creedence Clearwater Revival, Ricky Skaggs, Patty Griffin, Neil Young, Bob Dylan, Ralph Stanley and Led Zeppelin.

Discography

Albums

Other Appearances

Singles

Music videos

References

External links
 

1991 births
Living people
American women country singers
American country singer-songwriters
21st-century American singers
21st-century American women singers